Santosha (skt. संतोष saṃtoṣa) literally means "contentment, satisfaction". It is also an ethical concept in Indian philosophy, particularly Yoga, where it is included as one of the Niyamas by Patanjali.

Definition
Santosha, sometimes spelled Santosa, is a portmanteau in Sanskrit, derived from Saṃ- prefix (सं-, सम्-) and Tosha (तोष (from root √तुष्, √tuṣ)). SaM-, means "completely", "altogether" or "entirely", and Tosha (from the root √tus), "contentment", "satisfaction", "acceptance", "being comfortable". Combined, the word Santosha means "completely content with, or satisfied with, accepting and comfortable". Other words based on the root Tuṣht (तुष्टः), such as Santusht (सन्तुष्ट) and Tushayati (तुष्यति) are synonymous with Santosha, and found in ancient and medieval era Indian texts.

Isaacs translates Santosha as “contentment, accepting one's circumstances”. Woods describes it as the lack of Trsna (तृष्णा, craving) and desiring that which is necessary for one's life, while translating verse II.42 and II.32 of Yoga Sutrās, respectively. Others define it as an attitude of contentment, one of understanding and accepting oneself and one's environment and circumstances as they are, a spiritual state necessary for optimism and effort to change the future. Bhatta clarifies Santosha as inner contentment, a state of inner peace.

Yoga Darshana, which includes commentary of Rishi Vyasa on Patanjali's Yogasutra, defines contentment as the inner state where, "exists a joyful and satisfied mind regardless of one's environment, whether one meets with pleasure or pain, profit or loss, fame or contempt, success or failure, sympathy or hatred".

Discussion
Santosha as a Niyama is discussed in Indian texts at various levels - intent, inner state and its expression. As intent, Santosha is doing one's best and accepting the results of one's efforts. As inner state, it is contentment that combines with and works with other virtues such as Asteya (non-coveting, non-stealing), Aparigraha (non-hoarding, non-possessiveness) and Daya (compassion for others). As outward expression, Santosha is the observed "serenity", of being “totally satisfied, not desiring anything other than the fundamental".

Maréchal states that Santosha is rooted in the desire to avoid anything negative to self, to others, to all living beings and to nature. It is not the state of abandonment or being without any needs, rather the state of neither taking too much nor taking less than what one needs, one of contended optimism. It is the habit of being able to accept circumstances one finds self in, without being upset, of accepting oneself, and of equanimity with others who are balancing their own needs as they share what they have. Santosha is also abstaining from taking and consuming something to excess, even if its appearance makes it tempting. Maréchal states, that in cases the environment is one where one is forced to listen to a painful speech or someone's anger, Santosha is the serenity of accepting it completely as an instructive and constructive message, understanding the other, then detaching oneself and patiently seeking reform and change in one's environment.

Śankarâchârya, of the Vedanta school of Hinduism, in verses 521-548 of the text Vivekachudamani (The Crest-Jewel of Wisdom), states that Santosha is a necessary virtue because it frees a human being from the compulsions of all bondage, manipulation and fears, whereafter he can "dwell according to his will", do what he thinks is right, pursue his own calling wherever, whenever and however he wants. Johnston translates Śankarâchârya view on Santosha as the inner state where, "things neither distress him nor elate him much, nor is he attached to or repelled by them; in his own Self he ever joys, the Self is his rejoicing; altogether contented by the essence of uninterrupted bliss; with Santosha (contentment), he knows his Self – the Eternal, he is free from bondage, he is delighted no matter what, his life is victory; he moves where fancy leads him, unconstrained; he sleeps by the river-bank or the wood, his couch is the world; he moves in paths where the beaten road has ended; he then is one delighting in the supreme Eternal".

Literature
Santosha is a broadly discussed virtue in over thirty five ancient and medieval era texts of Hinduism. Most of these are in Sanskrit, but some are in regional Indian languages. As a few examples, Santosha is discussed as an important virtue and ethical concept in verses 2.1.39 through 2.1.48 of Purana Samhita, verse I.218-12 of Garuda Purana, verse 11-20 of Kurma Purana, verse 19.18 of Prapancha Sara, verse 24.156 of Paramananda, verse 3.18 of Shandilya Yoga Shastra, verses 2.1 to 2.2 of Yoga Yajnavalkya, and in verses 1.53 through 1.66 of Vasishtha Samhita. In some texts, such as Trishikhi Brahmana Upanishad and Sutrās, synonymous concepts and words such as Santusti (सन्तुष्टि) and Akama (अकाम, non-desire, non-neediness) are used, calling it as a virtue that represents "affection for the Supreme Reality". Samkhya Karika, in its section on ethics and the effect of virtues and vices on a human being, states contentment is achieved in nine categories, four of which are external and five internal to him.

Yoga Vashista describes the path to Santosha as follows,

In the Indian Epic Mahabharata, the virtue of Santosha is discussed in many books. For example, in Shanti Parva (the Book of Peace),

Mythology
The Vishnu Purana recites a myth that includes Santosha as a progeny of Tushti and Dharma, and it is loaded with symbolism. The myth is as follows,

The desire paradox
Scholars have questioned whether contentment (Santosha) is equal to having the "desire to be without desire", and if so, is it a paradox in itself? This question is of interest to both Hinduism and Buddhism. Herman states that there is a difference between the mindless pursuit of "craving" and mindful pursuit of "needs". The former is of concern to Indian philosophies, while for latter they acknowledge and encourage the proper pursuit of "needs".

Craving is an intense, ever-expansive compulsion to hoarding material possessions, an addiction for something or someone, and a state where the person accumulates the target of his greed or lust while ignoring dharma. Contentment is the opposite state, free from cravings that create bondage and dependence, an understanding of the minimum he needs and alternate ways to meet those needs, thus liberated to do whatever he wants and what feels right, proper, meaningful to him. Proper and simultaneous pursuit of dharma, artha and kama is respected in Hindu texts. For example, in Book 9, the Shalya Parva of the Epic Mahabharata, the proper and simultaneous pursuit of artha (wealth, profit, means of livelihood), dharma (righteousness, morality, ethics) and kama (love, pleasure, emotional contentment) is recommended,

In cases where there is conflict between Artha, Kama and Dharma, Vatsyayana states Artha precedes Kama, while Dharma precedes both Kama and Artha.

References

Further reading
 T.M.P. Mahadevan, The Pañcadaśī of Bhāratītīrtha-Vidyāraṇya: An Interpretative Exposition, Chapter 7 - Elucidation of Contentment, Centre of Advanced Study in Philosophy, University of Madras, 1969, 

Yoga concepts
Spirituality
Hindu philosophical concepts
Hindu ethics